An oblast is a type of federal subject in Russia.

Overview
Oblasts are constituent political entities in a federal union with representation in the Federation Council, and serve as a first-level administrative division. Each oblast features a state government holding authority over a defined geographic territory, with a state legislature, the Oblast Duma, that is democratically elected. The governor is the highest executive position of the state government in an Oblast, and is elected by people. Oblasts are divided into raions (districts), cities of oblast significance (district-equivalent independent cities), and autonomous okrugs, which are legally federal subjects equal to an oblast but are administratively subservient to one. Two oblasts have autonomous okrugs: Arkhangelsk Oblast (Nenets Autonomous Okrug) and Tyumen Oblast (Khanty-Mansi Autonomous Okrug and Yamalo-Nenets Autonomous Okrug).

The term oblast can be translated into English as "province" or "region", and there are currently 46 oblasts, the most common type of the 85 federal subjects in Russia. The majority of oblasts are named after their administrative center, the official term for a capital city in an oblast, which is generally the largest city. Exceptions to this include Leningrad Oblast and Moscow Oblast, which have no official capital, and Sakhalin Oblast, which is named after a geographic location. Leningrad Oblast and Sverdlovsk Oblast retain the previous names of Saint Petersburg and Yekaterinburg, respectively. Oblasts are typically areas that are predominantly populated by ethnic Russians and native Russian language speakers, and are mostly located in European Russia. The largest oblast by geographic size is Tyumen Oblast at 1,435,200 km2 (excluding autonomous okrugs Irkutsk Oblast is the largest at 767,900 km2) and the smallest is Kaliningrad Oblast at 15,100 km2. The most populous oblast is Moscow Oblast at 7,095,120 and the least populous is Magadan Oblast at 156,996.

Krais, another type of federal subject, are legally identical to oblasts and the difference between a political entity with the name "oblast" and one named "krai" is purely traditional.

History

In the Russian Empire, oblasts were a third-level administrative division, organized in 1849 and few in number, dividing the larger guberniyas (governorates) within the first-level krais. Following the numerous administration reforms during the Soviet era, the number of oblasts gradually increased as they became the primary top-level administrative division of the Soviet Socialist Republics (SSRs), the constituent political entities of the Soviet Union. These oblasts held very little autonomy or power, but when the Soviet Union dissolved into sovereign states along the lines of the SSRs, they became the first-level administrative divisions. The oblasts of the Russian SFSR, which transitioned into the Russian Federation, became the first-level administrative divisions of the new country and received greater devolved power.

During the 2022 Russian invasion of Ukraine, Russia annexed the Donetsk, Kherson, Luhansk and Zaporizhzhia regions of Ukraine. While Donetsk and Luhansk were incrorporated as republics, having their respecitve separate constitutions adopted since 2014 back when they were two breakaway states of Ukraine, Kherson and Zaporizhzhia were annexed as regular oblasts. The four regions remain internationally recognized as part of Ukraine and are only partially occupied by Russia.

List

Unrecognized

See also
Federal subjects of Russia
Republics of Russia
Volost

References

 
Federal subjects of Russia
Federal subjects of Russia-related lists